Georges Combret (1906–1998) was a French film director, producer and screenwriter.

Selected filmography
 Duel in Dakar (1951)
 The Fighting Drummer (1953)
 Rasputin (1954)
 The Contessa's Secret (1954)
 The Whole Town Accuses (1956)
 Marie of the Isles (1959)
 Hot Frustrations (1965)
 Ring Around the World (1966)
 Fire of Love (1967)
 The Curse of Belphegor (1967)
 Hot and Naked (1974)
 Le plumard en folie (1974)

References

Bibliography
 Hayward, Susan. French Costume Drama of the 1950s: Fashioning Politics in Film. Intellect Books, 2010.

External links

1906 births
1998 deaths
20th-century French screenwriters
French film producers
Film directors from Paris